The 1980 Clemson Tigers baseball team represented Clemson University in the 1980 NCAA Division I baseball season. The team played their home games at Beautiful Tiger Field in Clemson, South Carolina.

The team was coached by Bill Wilhelm, who completed his twenty-third season at Clemson.  The Tigers reached the 1980 College World Series, their fifth appearance in Omaha.

Roster

Schedule

References

Clemson
Clemson Tigers baseball seasons
Atlantic Coast Conference baseball champion seasons
College World Series seasons
Clemson baseball